Conrad "Connie" Saylor (June 3, 1940 – February 4, 1993 ) was a journeyman NASCAR racecar driver.

Career
Saylor did one-off events in the Winston Cup Series during the 1980s and early 1990s, and also raced in ARCA and late model sportsman series.  His most well-known moment came in the 1981 Twin 125s, qualifying races for the Daytona 500, in which he spun off turn two and flipped, sliding down the backstretch on his roof for about 1,000 feet. He was uninjured in the crash, and did not qualify for the race.  He won a consolation race at Daytona in 1984.

In Winston Cup racing, he picked up his best finish in his debut race, in 1978, eighth .

Personal life
Connie was married to Shirley Nowlin and had two children, Tracy and Tim Saylor. He started a mining and industrial tire and wheel business in Johnson city, Tennessee, in 1977, which is still in operation by his family.

Saylor was from Johnson City, Tennessee, . As verified by his family, he died at the age of 52 from cancer. .

Motorsports career results

NASCAR
(key) (Bold – Pole position awarded by qualifying time. Italics – Pole position earned by points standings or practice time. * – Most laps led.)

Winston Cup Series

Daytona 500

Busch Series

ARCA Permatex SuperCar Series
(key) (Bold – Pole position awarded by qualifying time. Italics – Pole position earned by points standings or practice time. * – Most laps led.)

References

External links
 

1940 births
1993 deaths
ARCA Menards Series drivers
Deaths from cancer in Tennessee
NASCAR drivers
People from Johnson City, Tennessee
Racing drivers from Tennessee